The 1957 Hardin–Simmons Cowboys football team was an American football team that represented Hardin–Simmons University in the Border Conference during the 1957 NCAA University Division football season. In its third season under head coach Sammy Baugh, the team compiled a 5–5 record (3–2 against conference opponents), tied for third place in the conference, and was outscored by a total of 240 to 211.  The team played its home games at Parramore Stadium, also known as Parramore Field, in Abilene, Texas.

Three Hardin-Simmons players were named to the 1957 All-Border Conference football team: guard Joe Biggs; tackle Ted Edmonston; and quarterback Ken Ford.

Schedule

References

Hardin-Simmons
Hardin–Simmons Cowboys football seasons
Hardin-Simmons Cowboys football